The 1956–57 Tunisian National Championship was the 31st season of football in Tunisia, and the first to start after the country's independence in March 1956.

Participating clubs
Stade Tunisien (ST)
Espérance de Tunis (EST)
Étoile du Sahel (ESS)
Club Africain (CA)
Jeunesse Sportive Methouienne (JSM)
Club Sportif de Hammam-Lif (CSHL)
Union Sportive de Ferryville (USF)
Club Athlétique Bizertin (CAB)
Olympique Tunisien (OT)
Club Tunisien (CT)
Patriote Football Club de Bizerte (PFCB)
Sfax Railways Sports (SRS)

Results

League table

Result table

Movements
 Releguated :
 None
 Promoted :
 Stade Populaire (SP)
 Stade Soussien  (SS)
 Union Sportive Tunisienne (UST)

Top scorers
20 goals :
Farzit (Jeunesse Sportive Methouienne)
19 goals :
Noureddine Diwa (Stade Tunisien)
 Saad Karmous (Club Sportif de Hammam-Lif)
17 goals :
Habib Mougou (Étoile du Sahel)
14 goals :
Abdelkader Ben Ezzeddine (Espérance de Tunis)
13 goals :
Kemais Gériani (Jeunesse Sportive Methouienne)
11 goals :
Hédi Feddou (Espérance de Tunis)
Hédi Hammoudia (Club Africain)
Laaroussi (Olympique Tunisien)

Champion
Stade Tunisien (ST)
 Line-up : Russo, Khaldi, Mahmoud, Chérif, Lakhal, Braiek, Abdelbaki, Noureddine Diwa, Barbéche, Miloud, Shabani, Naija, Laaroussi, Nahali, Rachid
 Coach : R. Turki

Notes and references

External links
1956–57 Ligue 1 on RSSSF.com

Tunisia
Tunisian Ligue Professionnelle 1 seasons
1956–57 in Tunisian football